Bolshoy Oreshkin is a rural locality (a khutor) in Mikhaylovka Urban Okrug, Volgograd Oblast, Russia. The population was 243 as of 2010. There are 9 streets.

Geography 
Bolshoy Oreshkin is located 20 km northeast of Mikhaylovka. Maly Oreshkin is the nearest rural locality.

References 

Rural localities in Mikhaylovka urban okrug